The 2023 European Athletics Indoor Championships was held from 2 to 5 March 2023 at the Ataköy Arena in Istanbul, Turkey, the first time the event took place in this country although the venue did stage the 2012 World Indoor Championships for which this 7000-seater was specifically built. The four-day competition was held during the centenary year of the Republic of Turkey, and featured 13 men's and 13 women's athletics events over three morning and four afternoon sessions.

On 11 November 2020, the European Athletic Association (EAA) chose Istanbul at its 160th Council Meeting held online due to the COVID-19 pandemic. The city was the only candidate that applied for the organization of this championships.

In a statement issued on 21 February 2023, European Athletics announced that the championships would take place as planned despite the Turkey–Syria earthquake, which struck southern and central Turkey on 6 February and affected 16 percent of country's population with more than 45,900 deaths, albeit with limitations on usual celebratory side-events and activities as well as no local promotion. Turkish Athletic Federation announced that all proceeds from ticket sales in the championship would be donated to the victims of the earthquake.

While 550 athletes from 47 European Athletics Member Federations competed in Ataköy Arena, it was the first time ever at a major European athletics championship that the number of female athletes competing (278) exceeded the number of male athletes (274). Norway topped the medal table with four gold and one silver medal. The Netherlands and Great Britain and Northern Ireland earned three gold medals each, while Italy, Belgium, Portugal, Switzerland and Finland secured two gold medals respectively. In the placing table, Italy came first with 84 points, while Norway placed ninth with 45 points.

Schedule
All times are local (UTC+3).

Qualification criteria
In individual events athletes could qualify by achieving the Entry Standard within the qualification period or by virtue of the World Athletics Rankings' position achieved at the end of the qualification period. About 50 percent of the athletes should have qualified via the Entry Standards, while the remaining participants were determined via the World Rankings. The qualification period ran 12 months from 20 February 2022 to 19 February 2023, except for the combined events where it ran 18 months from 20 August 2021 to 19 February 2023. Each nation could enter up to four qualified athletes in each individual event of whom up to three could participate. Countries who had no athletes who had achieved the Entry Standard and athletes who had been potentially qualified by World Rankings, could enter one unqualified male athlete and/or one unqualified female athlete in one individual event of the championships. Six national teams could take part in each 4 × 400 m relay event: one place was allocated to the team of the host nation, three places were allocated to best official teams in 4 x 400 m outdoor lists for 2022, while the remaining two places (or three if the host country did not take its allocated place as the Turkish women's relay) were allocated to teams with best accumulated 400 m times of individual athletes from 2023 indoor season as of 20 February 2023.

All athletes born before and including 2007 (aged at least 16 years on 31 December 2023) were eligible to compete, except for the men's shot put where the limit was 2005 (athletes aged at least 18 years on 31 December 2023).

Highlights

On 3 March, Belgium's Nafissatou Thiam broke the pentathlon world record of 5013 points set by Nataliya Dobrynska of Ukraine during the 2012 World Indoor Championships at the same Ataköy Arena, totalling a score of 5055 points. It was the first world record at the European Indoor Championships since 2011, making Thiam the first ever Belgian woman to set an official athletics world record (indoor or outdoor). In addition, with her third European indoor title, she became the most successful female pentathlete in history of this championships, retaining also her gold medal from the 2021 edition. Poland's Adrianna Sułek also went above previous record with a score of 5014 points and basically was the world record-holder for about six seconds, finishing first the 800 metres run, the final of the five events in pentathlon.

Two additional championship records were broken: Norway's Jakob Ingebrigtsen ran a time 3:33.95 in the 1500 metres and Dutch women's 4 × 400 m relay team achieved a mark of 3:25.66, making them the third-fastest national team in history. One men's heptathlon and one women's pentathlon championship best as well as 39 national indoor records were set. There were four world world-leading marks and eight European-leading marks.

Ingebrigtsen completed the 1500 m/3000 m 'double-double', successfully defending both his titles from 2021 to increase his overall tally to six medals, including five golds. Greece's Miltiadis Tentoglou became the first man to win three consecutive long jump titles. Portugal's Pedro Pichardo in the triple jump and France's Kevin Mayer in the heptathlon also retained their titles.

On the women's side, Netherland's Femke Bol secured the 400 m/4 × 400 m golden double as in previous edition. Great Britain's Keely Hodgkinson in the 800 metres, Ukraine's Yaroslava Mahuchikh in the high jump and Portugal's Auriol Dongmo in the shot put also retained their titles. Laura Muir won a British record fifth title, taking victory in the 1500 m, after her historic 1500 m/3000 m 'double-double' from 2017 and 2019. Finland's Reetta Hurske claimed gold in the 60 metres hurdles, the first ever medal for her nation in the event.

Men's results

Track

Field

Combined

Women's results

Track

Field

Combined

Legend
WR: world record | ER: European record | CR: championship record | NR: national record | WL: world leading | EL: European leading | PB: personal best | SB: seasonal best

Medal table

Source:

Placing table
The top eight finalists in each event scored points for their nation, with 8 points going to the gold medalists down to one point for each 8th place finisher. Non-finishers and disqualified athletes received zero points.

Source:

Participating nations
550 athletes from  47 member federations competed in the championships. In brackets the number of athletes participating.

 (1)
 (2)
 (2)
 (3)
 (2)
 (20)
 (3)
 (5)
 (6)
 (4)
 (14)
 (8)
 (6)
 (20)
 (38)
 (2)
 (28)
 (2)
 (29)
 (18)
 (15)
 (2)
 (12)
 (49)
 (2)
 (3)
 (6)
 (5)
 (2)
 (1)
 (1)
 (1)
 (29)
 (2)
 (18)
 (25)
 (22)
 (14)
 (2)
 (12)
 (3)
 (12)
 (29)
 (20)
 (23)
 (17)
 (10)

Media coverage
The European Athletics agreed broadcasting agreements with 26 countries, with remaining areas receiving coverage direct from the European Athletics via the Eurovision All Athletics platform.

References

External links

Official website
 Results book

 
European Athletics Indoor Championships
European Athletics Indoor Championships
European Athletics Indoor Championships
Sports competitions in Istanbul
International athletics competitions hosted by Turkey
European Athletics